American Music Awards of 2003 may refer to:

American Music Awards of 2003 (January)
American Music Awards of 2003 (November)